Your Lie in April is an anime television series adapted from the manga series of the same name by Naoshi Arakawa. The story follows a piano prodigy named Kōsei Arima, who had become famous as a child musician after dominating many competitions. However, after his mother died, he could no longer play the piano. Two years later, Kōsei meets a girl named Kaori Miyazono, who helps Kōsei return to the world of music by showing that music should be played freely and without restrictions, unlike Kōsei, who had played his music in a structured manner.

The anime was directed by Kyōhei Ishiguro at A-1 Pictures and written by Takao Yoshioka, featuring character designs and animation direction by Yukiko Aikei and music composed by Masaru Yokoyama. The series aired from October 9, 2014, to March 19, 2015, on Fuji TV's Noitamina block. Aniplex released the series in Japan on Blu-ray and DVD from February 25, 2015. The series is licensed by Aniplex of America within North America, who simulcasted the series on Aniplex Channel, Crunchyroll, Hulu and Viewster. Madman Entertainment licensed the series in Australia and New Zealand, who made the series available on AnimeLab. Anime Limited licensed the series in the United Kingdom and Ireland.

The series uses four pieces of theme music: two opening themes and two ending themes. (Seven Oops).



Episode list

Home video release
Aniplex released the series on DVD and Blu-ray in nine volumes, with the first volume being released on February 25, 2015, and the final volume being released on October 28, 2015. The series was later dubbed into English and released in two volumes in North America by Aniplex of America, with the first volume being released on March 29, 2016. In Australia and New Zealand, Madman Entertainment released the series in two volumes, with the first being released on July 6, 2016. In the United Kingdom, Anime Limited released the series in two volumes, with the first volume being released on November 14, 2016.

In 2020, Aniplex compiled the nine volumes and the OVA episode into a complete box set, scheduling the release for April 1, 2020.

Notes

References

External links
 
 

Your Lie in April